St Halvards plass was a tram stop on the Gamleby Line of the Oslo Tramway. It was located at the square St Halvards plass, on the intersection of Oslo gate and Bispegata in Gamlebyen, Oslo, Norway.

The station opened on 6 October 1875 as part of the Gamleby Line extension to Oslo Hospital by Kristiania Sporveisselskab. The station was served by lines 18 and 19, and before its closure, used both SL79 and SL95 trams. The nearest tram station is Middelalderparken. Nonetheless, St. Halvards plass is still in use as a bus stop.

References

Oslo Tramway stations in Oslo
Railway stations opened in 1878